Nicola Nanni (born 2 May 2000) is a Sammarinese footballer who plays as a forward for Italian  club Olbia and the San Marino national team. He is one of only a few professional footballers from San Marino.

Club career
In July 2016, Nanni joined Cesena from San Marino Calcio for his first move outside of his homeland. 

He signed a 5-year deal for Crotone of Serie B on 3 August 2018. Three days later he made his professional debut during a 4–0 victory against Giana Erminio in the 2018–19 Coppa Italia. On 29 August 2019, he joined Monopoli on loan.

Nanni received the 2019 , an honour given to the best San Marino footballer under the age of 23.

On 23 September 2020, he returned to Cesena on loan. Nanni was loaned out again, this time to Lucchese 1905 of Serie C, in August 2021 for the 2021–22 season.

On 15 July 2022, Nanni signed a two-year contract with Olbia in Serie C.

International career
Nanni made his senior national team debut on 15 November 2018 in a 2018–19 UEFA Nations League D match against Moldova. He scored his first senior international goal on 5 September 2021 in a 2022 FIFA World Cup qualification match against Poland. Though San Marino ultimately lost 7–1, Nanni's goal was his nation's first home goal in World Cup qualification in eight years.

Career statistics

International

International goals
Scores and results list San Marino's goal tally first.

Honours
San Marino Golden Boy Award: 2019

References

External links

UEFA profile
FSGC profile

2000 births
Living people
People from the City of San Marino
Sammarinese footballers
Association football forwards
Serie C players
F.C. Crotone players
S.S. Monopoli 1966 players
Cesena F.C. players
Lucchese 1905 players
Olbia Calcio 1905 players
Sammarinese expatriate footballers
Sammarinese expatriate sportspeople in Italy
Expatriate footballers in Italy
San Marino youth international footballers
San Marino under-21 international footballers
San Marino international footballers